Puerto Rico Highway 30 (PR-30), known as Expreso Cruz Ortiz Stella, is a main freeway in Puerto Rico which connects the city of Caguas to the town of Humacao.

Route description

Problems
This highway is considered highly dangerous due to the number of cars that transit it, partly because many people in Humacao and nearby municipalities work in San Juan. There are also concerns of cracks and holes, most of them in the right lane in both directions. The highway is in frequent repairs, especially the Caguas-Gurabo segment. There are possibilities that this highway has not been properly repaired, intentionally, because drivers speed up to more than the specified speed limit (55 mph) and having the highway repaired would mean more fatal accidents as a good highway would invite people to drive faster. Nevertheless, the segment between Caguas and Gurabo has been repaired and repaved, and the segment in Las Piedras is being repaired and expanded near the exit to PR-183 mainly because of the large number of vehicles taking this exit and creating a congestion in the freeway. The segments between Gurabo and Juncos are not repaired and have a significant number of cracks and holes. Another problem with PR-30 is that it turns very slippery when wet and cars still drive above speed limit (55 mph). Many people have died in the freeway and is considered one of the most dangerous in the island.

Parallel routes
PR-198 and PR-189 parallel the freeway almost in its entire length, and they never get far from the freeway. PR-189 (Caguas-Juncos) has two junctions with PR-30- one in Gurabo near Caguas and the other in Juncos. PR-198 does the same in Juncos and Humacao. PR-183 also parallels the highway but it lies significantly south, and two connectors and one exit connect them- PR-203 from Gurabo to San Lorenzo, PR-204 in Las Piedras and the Exit 21 in the same town. PR-183 ends in Las Piedras.

Exit list

See also

 List of highways numbered 30

References

External links

 http://www.dtop.gov.pr/act/default.htm
 http://elname.com/2008/01/dtop-revela-que-las-condiciones-de-las.html
 http://www.miperiodico.org/noticiasread.asp?r=HBHIXYOAML 

030